San Guglielmo is a Roman Catholic church located in the town of Chieri, in the metropolitan city of Turin, in the region of Piedmont, Italy.

History 
Built in the 15th century, the church has since the 16th century been affiliated with the Confraternity of the Holy Spirit. The Baroque-style bell tower was designed by Giovanni Battista Feroggio. In the 18th-century, the interior was decorated with rococo stucco. The main altar was sculpted by Francesco Riva.

The chapel to the right of the main altar has a canvas depicting the Adoration of the Magi by Francesco Fea. The relics of St Theodore Martyr are housed in a niche. At one time, one of the aims of the confraternity was the conversion of Jews from the adjacent Ghetto.

References 

15th-century Roman Catholic church buildings in Italy
Roman Catholic churches in Chieri
Baroque architecture in Piedmont